Teulisna basigera is a moth of the family Erebidae first described by Francis Walker in 1865. It is found in India.

References

basigera
Moths described in 1865